Garry Winogrand:All Things are Photographable is a 2018 documentary film about the photographer Garry Winogrand. It was directed and produced by Sasha Waters Freyer.

Distribution
The film premiered in March 2018 at South by Southwest, had a limited release in U.S. cinemas in September 2018 and is intended to be broadcast as part of the American Masters series on PBS.

Cast

Geoff Dyer
Jeffrey Fraenkel (of Fraenkel Gallery)
Susan Kismaric
Erin O'Toole
Tod Papageorge
Leo Rubinfien
Jeffrey Henson Scales
Adrienne Lubeau
Shelley Rice
Thomas Roma
Laurie Simmons
Matt Stuart
Michael Ernest Sweet
Matthew Weiner
Garry Winogrand (archive footage)

Awards
2018: Special Jury Recognition for Best Feminist Reconsideration of a Male Artist, South by Southwest, Austin, TX

References

External links

2018 films
2010s biographical films
2018 documentary films
American biographical films
American documentary films
Documentary films about photographers
2010s English-language films
2010s American films